Laurie Calvin Battle (May 10, 1912 – May 2, 2000) was a U.S. Representative from Alabama. He was in the United States Army Air Forces and served in the Asiatic-Pacific Theater during World War II.

Biography
Born in Wilsonville, Alabama, Battle graduated from Deshler High School in Tuscumbia, Alabama in 1930.

He received his Bachelor of Arts from Birmingham-Southern College, Birmingham, Alabama, 1934. He attended Vanderbilt University, Nashville, Tennessee, and Scarritt College, Nashville, Tennessee, 1934 and 1935. He received a Master of Arts from Ohio State University, Columbus, Ohio, in 1939.

He attended the University of Alabama in 1946. He was in the United States Army Air Forces from February 19, 1942, to March 6, 1946, and served in the Asiatic-Pacific Theater during World War II. He was in the United States Air Force Reserve from 1946 to 1972 and retired as a colonel. He worked as a farm laborer, as a professor at Ohio State University in Columbus, Ohio in 1940, as an insurance agent, and as a professional advocate.

Battle was elected as a Democrat to the 80th and to the three succeeding Congresses, serving from January 3, 1947, to January 3, 1955. He was not a candidate for renomination in 1954, but was an unsuccessful candidate for the Democratic nomination for the United States Senate. He served as staff director and counsel of the House Rules Committee from 1966 to 1976. He served as special adviser to the United States League of Savings Associations, Washington, D.C. from 1976 to 1988.

He died on May 2, 2000, in Bethesda, Maryland, and is interred in Arlington National Cemetery in Arlington, Virginia.

References

External links

1912 births
2000 deaths
People from Shelby County, Alabama
Ohio State University faculty
Ohio State University alumni
United States Air Force colonels
United States Army Air Forces officers
United States Army Air Forces personnel of World War II
Burials at Arlington National Cemetery
Democratic Party members of the United States House of Representatives from Alabama
20th-century American politicians